Platypodia is a genus of crabs in the family Xanthidae, containing the following species:

 Platypodia alcocki Buitendijk, 1941
 Platypodia cristata (A. Milne Edwards, 1865)
 Platypodia delli Takeda & Webber, 2006
 Platypodia eydouxi (A. Milne Edwards, 1865)
 Platypodia foresti Serene, 1984
 Platypodia granulosa (Ruppell, 1830)
 Platypodia morini (Ward, 1942)
 Platypodia pseudogranulosa Serene, 1984
 Platypodia semigranosa (Heller, 1861)
 Platypodia tomentosa (De Man, 1902)

References

Xanthoidea